USS Thetis Bay (CVE-90) was the thirty-sixth of fifty s built for the United States Navy during World War II. She was launched in March 1944, commissioned in April, and served as a transport carrier in the Pacific, as well as a replenishment carrier supporting the Allied bombardment of Tokyo and the Main Islands. Postwar, she participated in Operation Magic Carpet, before being decommissioned in August 1946, being mothballed in the Pacific Reserve Fleet. She was reactivated in July 1956, and converted to a helicopter transport carrier, serving in relief operations in Taiwan and Haiti. Ultimately, she was broken up in 1966, the last Casablanca-class hull to be scrapped.

Design and description

Thetis Bay was a Casablanca-class escort carrier, the most numerous type of aircraft carrier ever built, and was designed specifically to be rapidly mass-produced using prefabricated sections, in order to replace heavy early-war losses. By the end of their production run, the time taken between laying down the hull and launching the ship had been cut down to nearly one month. She was powered with two Skinner Unaflow reciprocating steam engines, which drove two shafts, providing , thus enabling her to make . Her compact size limited the length of the flight deck and necessitated the installment of an aircraft catapult at her bow, and there were two aircraft elevators to facilitate movement of aircraft between the flight and hangar deck: one each fore and aft.

One /38 caliber dual-purpose gun was mounted on the stern. Anti-aircraft defense was provided by eight Bofors  anti-aircraft guns in single mounts, as well as twelve Oerlikon  cannons, which were mounted around the perimeter of the deck. By the end of the war, Casablanca-class carriers had been modified to carry thirty  cannons, and the amount of Bofors  guns had been doubled to 16, by putting them into twin mounts. These modifications were in response to increasing casualties due to kamikaze attacks. Although Casablanca-class escort carriers were designed to function with a crew of 860 and an embarked squadron of 50 to 56, the exigencies of wartime often necessitated the inflation of the crew count. Casablanca-class escort carriers were designed to carry 27 aircraft, but the hangar deck could accommodate more, which was often necessary during transport or especially training missions, due to the constant turnover of pilots and aircraft.

She had a designed complement of 900 crew and 938 troops, was armed with four twin  anti-aircraft guns, and carried twenty helicopters.

Construction
Her construction was awarded to Kaiser Shipbuilding Company, Vancouver, Washington, under a Maritime Commission contract, on 18 June 1942. The escort carrier was laid down on 22 December 1943 under the name Thetis Bay, located within Kuiu Island, as part of a tradition which named escort carriers after bays or sounds in Alaska. The bay itself was named by the United States National Geodetic Suvery in 1928 after the United States Revenue Cutter Service cutter Thetis, which in turn was named after the sea nymph Thetis, the daughter of Nereus and the mother of Achilles in Greek mythology. She was laid down as MC hull 1127, the thirty-sixth of a series of fifty Casablanca-class escort carriers. She therefore received the classification symbol CVE-90, indicating that she was the ninetieth escort carrier to be commissioned into the United States Navy. She was launched on 16 March 1944; sponsored by Mrs. Rico Botta, the wife of Captain Botta, the Assembly and Repair Officer overseeing Naval Air Station North Island; transferred to the Navy and commissioned on 12 April 1944, with Captain Donald Edmund Wilcox in command. Notably, actress Claudette Colbert's husband, Joel Pressman, a lieutenant commander in the Medical Corps served as the first medical officer at the time of the commissioning.

Service history

World War II

Upon being commissioned, Thetis Bay undergone a shakedown cruise down the West Coast to San Diego, California. Upon finishing, she was assigned to transport duty, and proceeded north towards San Pedro to take on a load of aircraft and passengers. She put out to sea on 5 June, stopped at Pearl Harbor on 11 June, and headed out, via Makin Island of the Gilberts Islands and Majuro of the Marshall Islands, to Kwajalein. There, she took on the 50th Engineer Combat Battalion of the United States Army, which she deposited back at Pearl Harbor on 5 July.

On 7 July, Thetis Bay got underway for Alameda ferrying 41 aircraft that required repairs. She steamed into port on 13 July, and after unloading her cargo, headed for Terminal Island, Los Angeles for a three-week overhaul. Finishing in August, she resumed transport duties on 11 August, delivering spare parts, replacement aircraft, and military passengers from the West Coast to bases in Hawaii and the Marshalls. After completing her first transport tour on 13 September, she made five more round-trip missions, spanning September 1944 to mid-April 1945, ferrying supplies from the United States to a variety of destinations in the Pacific, ranging from Pearl Harbor to Finschhafen, New Guinea. During this period, Captain Benjamin Eugene Moore Jr. raised his flag over the ship on 21 January 1945.

On 12 June, Thetis Bay steamed into Pearl Harbor carrying a load of aircraft, having departed from San Diego. There, she was assigned to become a replenishment carrier as a part of Task Group 50.8.4, the mobile replenishment group supporting the frontline Fast Carrier Task Force. Replenishment escort carriers such as Thetis Bay enabled the frontline carriers to replace battle losses, and to stay at sea for longer durations of time. She first headed to Apra Harbor in Guam of the Mariana Islands, arriving on 25 June. Then, she headed westwards, making her first rendezvous with the fast carriers on 12 July, when she transferred 40 of her replenishment aircraft. She returned to Guam on 22 July to take on more aircraft, before she departed on 24 July, making another rendezvous on 31 July. She then replenished at Guam, before heading out once again, resupplying the frontline carriers from 14 August to 8 September. As she began her replenishment mission, news broke of the Japanese surrender, and her replenishment aircraft were used to support the initial landings in the Occupation of Japan.

Post-war

Upon finishing her replenishment mission, Thetis Bay returned to the United States via Guam, arriving at Alameda on 7 September. There, she joined the "Magic Carpet" fleet, which repatriated U.S. servicemen from throughout the Pacific. She cruised around the Pacific, making stops and returning U.S. servicemen back to the mainland. During one of her stops, Captain Allen Smith Jr. took over command of the vessel on 19 October. She completed her "Magic Carpet" duties, and was discharged in January 1946. Inactivation work was conducted in the Naval Inactive Ship Maintenance Facility at Bremerton, Washington. Upon the completion of that work, she was decommissioned and mothballed on 7 August 1946, joining the Tacoma group of the Pacific Reserve Fleet.

In May 1955, Thetis Bay was withdrawn from the Pacific Reserve Fleet and towed to the San Francisco Naval Shipyard under project SCB 122, where she began conversion into the Navy's first assault helicopter aircraft carrier. On 1 July, she was redesignated as such, receiving the hull symbol CVHA-1. Ships of her type were expected to act as a complement to attack transports, providing them with vertical assault capabilities. She was recommissioned on 20 July 1956, with Captain Thomas Winfield South, II, in command. Her conversion was finally completed six weeks later on 1 September, with a portion of the aft section of her flight deck having been cut away.

Thetis Bay then proceeded southwards towards her new home part, arriving at Long Beach on 20 September. There, she took on the helicopters of Marine Corps Test Unit No. 1, based at Camp Pendleton, who demonstrated landing and take-off techniques on this novel type of ship. She then participated in amphibious training exercises off of the California coast, evaluating her planned complementary role, before deploying to the Far East on 10 July 1957. Having completed a short tour of duty, she returned to Long Beach on 11 December, where she resumed local operations. During 1958 and 1959, she conducted a variety of operations, including vertical envelopment exercises off of Luzon, the Philippines, throughout February 1958.

On 28 May 1959, she was reclassified as a landing platform helicopter amphibious assault ship, and thus, received the hull symbol LPH-6. In August 1959, severe flooding, starting on 7 August, exacerbated by Typhoon Billie, which had earlier struck in July, killed more than a thousand people in Taiwan. Thus, Thetis Bay, which was serving with the Seventh Fleet at the time, was dispatched from Hong Kong on 12 August, proceeding to Taiwan to conduct relief operations. There, she used her 21 Marine Corps Sikorsky H-34s of Marine Helicopter Transport Squadron (Light) 261 (HMR(L)-261) to ferry aid and transport stranded civilians. In addition, the helicopters had ferried 850 passengers throughout the operation.

Thetis Bay, in May 1960, took part in a training night assault landing at Camp Pendleton. This practice operation represented the first large-scale night landing of ground forces by helicopters based on board a carrier. She deployed to the western Pacific for the spring of 1961, and upon completing her tour and returning to Long Beach, she was transferred to the United States Atlantic Fleet. She arrived at Norfolk, Virginia, her new home port, in early December 1961.

For the next three years, Thetis Bay operated along the Atlantic coast and in the Caribbean. In October 1962, during the height of the Cuban Missile Crisis, she proceeded into the naval "quarantine" area along with her helicopter contingent and a marine landing team, standing by for potential actions. In the spring of 1963, she ferried special aircraft required for President John F. Kennedy's planned visit to West Germany to Hamburg. In September 1963, she headed to Haiti, which had been affected by Hurricane Flora. She anchored off Port-au-Prince and launched Marine helicopters carrying medical aid and food supplies.

Thetis Bay left Norfolk on 5 January 1964, heading to the Naval Inactive Ship Maintenance Facility in Philadelphia, Pennsylvania, for inactivation work, arriving there on 6 January. There, she was decommissioned, once again, joining the Philadelphia group of the Atlantic Reserve Fleet. She was struck from the Naval Vessel Register on 1 March 1964, and she was sold for scrapping in December 1964 to Peck Iron & Metal Co., Inc., headquartered at Portsmouth, Virginia. She was proposed to be transferred to the Spanish Navy, but the  light aircraft carrier  was sent in her place. She was ultimately broken up in 1966. Thetis Bay received one battle star for her World War II service. Her name plate is on display at Freedom Park, Omaha, Nebraska.

References

Sources

Online sources

Bibliography

External links 

 
 

Casablanca-class escort carriers
World War II escort aircraft carriers of the United States
Cold War amphibious assault ships of the United States
Ships built in Vancouver, Washington
1944 ships
S4-S2-BB3 ships